Blake Feese (born February 8, 1982) is a second-generation American auto racing driver. He competed in USAC before joining Hendrick Motorsports in 2004 and 2005 as a development driver, racing in ARCA and the NASCAR Busch Series for the team. After being released from that deal, he drove in those two series as well as the NASCAR Truck Series part-time with a number of other teams through 2011.

Racing career

Early career
Feese began racing at the age of ten in quarter midgets, where he won his first two starts, moving up to Mini-sprints two years later. He won the 600cc track championship at Jacksonville Raceway in the mini-sprint division in 1998, before moving up to main Sprint Cars, where he won once, and was named Rookie of the Year.

In 2000, he drove in the International Racing Association, winning three races. In 2001, he competed in his first World of Outlaws race at Bristol Motor Speedway, finishing ninth. Later, he won a WoO sanctioned event at Knoxville Raceway, then won again at the All-Star sprint at Eldora Speedway the following season.

NASCAR
Late in the season, he met NASCAR winner Jimmy Spencer, who would help Feese get a NASCAR driving contract.

After going through 2003 without a major ride, Feese met Rick Hendrick and signed to drive two races for him that season in the ARCA series. In his second start at Nashville Superspeedway, Feese qualified 3rd and won the race. After posting two more top-tens that season, he won his second career ARCA race at Talladega Superspeedway. He made his Busch Series debut at Kentucky Speedway in the No. 87 ditech Chevrolet Monte Carlo for NEMCO Motorsports, starting sixteenth but finishing 41st after an early crash. After running two more races for NEMCO, he finished the year running the No. 00 Chevy for Haas CNC Racing, posting his best finish of the year, a 25th at the Aaron's 312.

In 2005, Feese moved up to the Busch Series to share the No. 5 Lowe's Chevy with fellow Hendrick development driver Boston Reid. Feese struggled during the season however, his best finish being a 23rd at Atlanta out of six starts. He also made his Craftsman Truck Series debut at Kentucky for Billy Ballew Motorsports, starting 30th and finishing 15th.

At the end of 2005, Feese was released from his contract at Hendrick, and went back to racing sprint cars in Indiana during his time without a ride, of which he would not find one until 2007, where he ran a limited ARCA and Busch Series schedule with Sadler Brothers Racing. He also attempted to qualify for the ARCA season-opener at Daytona for Baker Curb Racing using Norm Benning Racing's owner points, but failed to qualify. Feese did not run any NASCAR or ARCA races until August 2009, where he competed in the Truck Series race at Nashville in the No. 15 Toyota Tundra for Billy Ballew Motorsports, starting 18th and finishing 12th.

In 2011, Feese would join Turner Motorsports, competing in most of the second half of the Truck Series season in their No. 32 truck, replacing Brad Sweet, who only ran the first eight races of the season in the truck.

Feese was replaced by Miguel Paludo, who moved over from the No. 7 Red Horse Racing truck, in the Turner No. 32 for 2012, which left him without a ride. He ended up not finding a ride for that year or any year after that.

Motorsports career results

NASCAR
(key) (Bold – Pole position awarded by qualifying time. Italics – Pole position earned by points standings or practice time. * – Most laps led.)

Busch Series

Camping World Truck Series

ARCA Re/Max Series
(key) (Bold – Pole position awarded by qualifying time. Italics – Pole position earned by points standings or practice time. * – Most laps led.)

References

External links
 Official Website 
 
 Feese at ARCAracing.com

1982 births
ARCA Menards Series drivers
Living people
NASCAR drivers
People from McLean County, Illinois
Racing drivers from Illinois
World of Outlaws drivers
Stewart-Haas Racing drivers
Hendrick Motorsports drivers